I Love the 2000s is a miniseries, the twelfth and final installment of the I Love the... series, and the sequel to I Love the New Millennium on VH1. Two episodes premiered each night from Tuesday to Saturday, corresponding to the years from 2000 to 2009. It premiered on June 17 and ended on June 21, 2014.

Commentators

Adrienne Bailon
Afroman
Colleen Ballinger
Brian Balthazar
Kevin Barnett
Alison Becker
Christina Bianco
Nikki Blonsky
Chris Booker
Joanna Bradley
Mike Britt
Kevin Burkhardt
Regan Burns
Michelle Buteau
Jessie Cantrell
Jordan Carlos
Charlemagne Tha God
JC Coccoli
Claudia Cogan
Molly Culver
Lindsay Czarniak
Dan Cummins
Lee DeWyze
Simon Doonan
Bil Dwyer
Jeff Dye
Mike Einziger
Robert Englund
Chris Fairbanks
Christian Finnegan
Greg Fitzsimmons
Jake Fogelnest
The Fray
B.D. Freeman
Judah Friedlander
Tiffany Haddish
Seth Herzog
Dave Hill
Dave Holmes
Micah Jesse
Naia Kete
Mike Kelton
Jo Koy
Esther Ku
Damian Kulash
Pete Lee
Lil Mama
Jared Logan
Loni Love
Luenell
Carmen Lynch
Biz Markie
Kevin McCaffrey
Edwin McCain
Bonnie McKee
Brian McKnight
Paul Mecurio
Bret Michaels
Shanna Moakler
Modern Humorist (Michael Colton and John Aboud)
Mya
Aparna Nancherla
Nelly
Jonathan Van Ness
Felicia Pearson
Brooke Van Poppelen
Rachel Quaintance
Carey Reilly
Catherine Reitman
Lindsay Rhodes
April Rose
Giulia Rozzi
Fuji Ruiz
Amanda Seales
Adam Sank
Steve Schirripa
Marianne Sierk
Sherrod Small
Sue Smith
Hal Sparks
Dan St. Germain
French Stewart
Ted Stryker
George Takei
Emily Tarver
Tilly & the Wall
Charlie Todd
Mike Trainor
Nick Turner
Brian Unger
Baron Vaughn
Jorge Vega
Lauren Weedman
Brendon Walsh
Pete Wentz
Dashaun Wesley
Trevor Wesley
Wil Wheaton
Michael Kenneth Williams
Nika Williams
Andrew W.K.
Chris Wylde
Henry Zebrowski

Recurring segments
 George Takei's Oh My! Moment: In a nod to the famous line that was said by his Star Trek character Hikaru Sulu, George Takei covers the most outrageous moment of the year that made the headlines.
 Hotties: Nelly lists three female entertainment personalities from each year. The music (with a video, which is shown on the segment.) is heard on the episode: 2002 (see below).
 The Year in Spears: A retrospective montage presents every Britney Spears moment from each year.
 Anti-Hero: For each year, Michael Kenneth Williams presents a well-known character from a movie or TV show whose mostly shades of grey.
 Guilty Pleasures: Bret Michaels highlights the guilty pleasures from a certain year.
 Hal Sparks' Millennium Remix: The end of the episode featured an auto-tuned remix of Hal Sparks recapping the year that was discussed.

Topics covered by year

2000
 Trading Spaces
 Almost Famous
 Pokémon (previously covered in I Love the '90s: Part Deux)
 Tiger Woods wins the 2000 U.S. Open
 The Perfect Storm
 Who Wants to Be a Millionaire? 
 Text messaging
 "Smooth" by Santana and Rob Thomas
 Crouching Tiger, Hidden Dragon
 "Blue (Da Ba Dee)" by Eiffel 65 
 Speed dating
 Charlie's Angels
 Dora the Explorer
 "Back at One" by Brian McKnight
 American Psycho
 "All the Small Things" by Blink 182 (previously mentioned in an I Love the New Millennium segment)
 Jared Fogle
 Cheaters

George Takei's Oh My! Moment of 2000: The rise and fall of Robert Downey Jr.

Hotties of 2000: Sarah Michelle Gellar, Halle Berry and Faith Hill

The Year in Spears (2000): Britney's sophomore album Oops!... I Did It Again

Anti-Hero of 2000: Tony Soprano

Guilty Pleasures of 2000: Bring It On, Gilmore Girls and Von Dutch hats

2001
 Bridget Jones' Diary
 Mariah Carey invades TRL
 "Because I Got High" by Afroman
 Bratz
 Legally Blonde
 MP3 players
 "Let Me Blow Ya Mind" by Eve and Gwen Stefani
 Wikipedia
 Drew Barrymore and Tom Green get married
 "Thank You" by Dido 
 Listerine Pocketpaks
 Grand Theft Auto III
 Harry Potter and the Sorcerer's Stone 
 Danny Almonte
 Crossing Over with John Edward 
 Richard Reid wears bombs in his shoes to Flight 63
 "Kryptonite" by 3 Doors Down
 Donnie Darko

George Takei's Oh My! Moment of 2001: Björk's Oscar outfit.

Hotties of 2001: Nicole Kidman, Jennifer Lopez and Estella Warren

The Year in Spears (2001): MTV Video Music Awards-The yellow snake and "I'm a Slave 4 U"

Anti-Hero of 2001: Jack Bauer

Guilty Pleasures of 2001: The Fast and the Furious, Temptation Island and denim mini-skirts

2002
 Blue Crush
 Axis of evil
 "Hot in Herre" by Nelly
 Bennifer
 Serena Williams
 "Soak Up the Sun" by Sheryl Crow
 The Wire
 Juicy Couture
 World Series of Poker
 "Superman (It's Not Easy)" by Five for Fighting 
 Verizon's "Can You Hear Me Now? Good" advertisement
 Chicago
 Anna Nicole Smith wins $88 million lawsuit
 "The Middle" by Jimmy Eat World 
 Ringtones
 28 Days Later
 "Work It" by Missy Elliott
 Satellite radio
 8 Mile

George Takei's Oh My! Moment of 2002: Michael Jackson dangling baby Blanket over a balcony.

Hotties of 2002: Brandy, Jessica Alba and Kelly Ripa

The Year in Spears (2002): Britney breaks up with Justin Timberlake, Her movie Crossroads is a box office bomb which also earned Britney her first Razzie, and Forbes Celebrity 100 ranked Britney at #1.

Anti-Hero of 2002: Vic Mackey

Guilty Pleasures of 2002: Crank Yankers and spray tan

2003
 Star Wars Kid
 "Ignition (Remix)" by R. Kelly 
 Demi Moore and Ashton Kutcher
 Queer Eye for the Straight Guy
 Steve Bartman incident
 Monster
 Paris Hilton
 Freedom fries 
 "All the Things She Said" by t.A.T.u 
 Da Ali G Show 
 Newlyweds: Nick & Jessica
 "Seven Nation Army" by The White Stripes
 Blackout in the Northeast
 Freddy vs. Jason
 Dixie Chicks bash George W. Bush
 Kill Bill: Volume 1

George Takei's Oh My! Moment of 2003: Don Zimmer gets owned by Pedro Martinez.

Hotties of 2003: Kristanna Loken, Jennifer Garner and Kate Beckinsale

The Year in Spears (2003): Britney performs at the VMAs with Madonna and Christina Aguilera, released her fourth album, and wins a Grammy for "Toxic".

Anti-Hero of 2003: Magneto

Guilty Pleasures of 2003: Gigli, "I Believe in a Thing Called Love" by The Darkness and America's Next Top Model

2004
 White Chicks
 Pimp My Ride
 "Lean Back" by Terror Squad
 George W. Bush's re-election
 The Dean scream
 Saw
 Desperate Housewives
 Designer dogs
 The Notebook
 The Swan and I Want a Famous Face
 Livestrong wristbands
 Entourage
 Napoleon Dynamite
 The final episode of Friends
 Harold & Kumar Go to White Castle
 "Tipsy" by J-Kwon
 Mean Girls

George Takei's Oh My! Moment of 2004: The Passion of the Christ becomes a box-office hit.

Hotties of 2004: Elisha Cuthbert, Thandie Newton and Portia de Rossi

The Year in Spears (2004): The gradual downward spiral begins: Britney marries her childhood friend Jason Allen Alexander in Las Vegas in January, quickly gets the marriage annulled, then marries Kevin Federline in July.

Anti-Hero of 2004: Gregory House

Guilty Pleasures of 2004: Catwoman, Ashlee Simpson and Laguna Beach: The Real Orange County

2005
 Brokeback Mountain 
 "Since U Been Gone" by Kelly Clarkson 
 Heelys
 "Trapped in the Closet (Chapter 1)" by R. Kelly
 Mr. & Mrs. Smith
 How I Met Your Mother
 Bluetooth
 The Polar Express (originally released in 2004)
 Hell's Kitchen
 "Collide" by Howie Day 
 Terrell Owens
 "Lazy Sunday" by The Lonely Island
 Ann Coulter
 "Beverly Hills" by Weezer 
 Renée Zellweger and Kenny Chesney's short-lived marriage
 Parkour
 Mad Money
 King Kong

George Takei's Oh My! Moment of 2005: Brangelina

Hotties of 2005: Eva Longoria, Natalie Portman and Jessica Biel

The Year in Spears (2005): TV show Britney and Kevin: Chaotic premieres on the UPN, and Britney's first child is born.

Anti-Hero of 2005: Tommy Gavin

Guilty Pleasures of 2005: "Don't Cha" by The Pussycat Dolls, Dancing with the Stars and the Enormous Omelet Sandwich

2006
 Flavor of Love
 Wii
 Tyra Banks
 Pluto's demise
 Death of Steve Irwin
 The Da Vinci Code
 Zinedine Zidane headbutts a player 
 "Promiscuous" by Nelly Furtado and Timbaland
 Hannah Montana
 A Million Little Pieces by James Frey
 The Devil Wears Prada
 Diet Coke and Mentos eruption
 "Hips Don't Lie" by Shakira and Wyclef Jean
 Paul McCartney and Heather Mills split
 High School Musical
 Eat, Pray, Love by Elizabeth Gilbert
 "Laffy Taffy" by D4L
 Snakes on a Plane

George Takei's Oh My! Moment of 2006: Lindsay Lohan and Paris Hilton have a war of words.

Hotties of 2006: Grace Park, Hayden Panettiere and Vanessa Williams

The Year in Spears (2006): Britney is photographed driving with Sean Preston in her lap, gives birth to her second child, kicks Kevin Federline to the curb, and exposes her hoo-ha while leaving a vehicle.

Anti-Hero of 2006: Dexter Morgan

Guilty Pleasures of 2006: Paris Hilton's music career, Sanjaya Malakar, and Channing Tatum in Step Up

2007
 Rock of Love with Bret Michaels
 Juno
 "Lip Gloss" by Lil Mama
 Andrew Meyer gets tazed
 Yo Gabba Gabba!
 Google Street View
 "Crank That (Soulja Boy)" by Soulja Boy Tell'em
 Larry Craig's sex scandal
 Sammy Stephens
 Gossip Girl
 Bacon craze
 Barry Bonds breaks home run record and gets busted for steroids
 Hairspray
 Rock Band
 Get a Mac
 Harry Potter and the Deathly Hallows by J.K. Rowling
 Paranormal Activity

George Takei's Oh My! Moment of 2007: The Oscar De La Hoya cross-dressing scandal.

Hotties of 2007: Rihanna, Evangeline Lilly and Rachel Bilson

The Year in Spears (2007): Britney checks into a drug rehab facility, shaves her own head, attacks a photographer's car with an umbrella and half-heartedly performs at the VMAs, resulting in "LEAVE BRITNEY ALONE!"

Anti-Hero of 2007: Don Draper

Guilty Pleasures of 2007: Megan Fox in Transformers, Cobra Starship and Jon & Kate Plus Eight

2008
 Deal or No Deal 
 Slap Chop
 2008 Summer Olympics
 Twilight
 Friday Night Lights 
 Facebook (originally introduced in 2004)
 Barack Obama elected President of the United States
 "Paper Planes" by M.I.A.
 Breaking Bad
 "All Summer Long" by Kid Rock
 Lindsay Lohan and Samantha Ronson
 Rickrolling
 The Curious Case of Benjamin Button
 "I Kissed a Girl" by Katy Perry
 The Dark Knight
 Thomas Beatie
 Indiana Jones and the Kingdom of the Crystal Skull

George Takei's Oh My! Moment of 2008: David Duchovny checks into rehab for sex addiction the same year he won his first Golden Globe and starred in The X-Files sequel.

Hotties of 2008: Danica Patrick, Hope Solo and Adriana Lima

The Year in Spears (2008): Britney launches the comeback of the century with an appearance on How I Met Your Mother, a Grammy nomination for "Womanizer", and "Piece of Me" clean sweeping the VMAs.

Anti-Hero of 2008: Nancy Botwin

Guilty Pleasures of 2008: Celebrity Rehab with Dr. Drew, Snuggie and To Catch a Predator (previously covered on I Love the New Millennium)

2009
 Jersey Shore
 Balloon boy hoax
 Precious
 David After Dentist
 Miracle on the Hudson River
 Susan Boyle
 "Tik Tok" by Kesha
 Taken 
 Shake Weight
 Glee
 Octomom
 Lady Gaga
 First inauguration of Barack Obama
 Tiger Woods caught cheating with several mistresses
 "Party in the U.S.A." by Miley Cyrus
 Avatar

George Takei's Oh My! Moment of 2009: David Letterman's illicit relationship with his intern.

Hotties of 2009: Zoe Saldana, Olivia Wilde and Alicia Keys

The Year in Spears (2009): Britney releases her second greatest hits album, scores another #1 hit, is presented with the Ultimate Choice Award at the 2009 Teen Choice Awards, and launches the Circus Tour.
 
Anti-Hero of 2009: Jackie Peyton

Guilty Pleasures of 2009: Hoarders, Pitbull and Angry Birds

References

External links
 

Nostalgia television shows
Nostalgia television in the United States
VH1 original programming
2010s American television miniseries
2014 American television series debuts
2014 American television series endings